The 2019 Asian Women's Softball Championship was an international softball tournament which featured ten nations and was held from 1–7 May 2019 in Jakarta, Indonesia. Matches were held at the Gelora Bung Karno Softball Stadium

The tournament also serves as the qualifiers for the WBSC Softball Asia/Oceania 2019 Qualifying Event for the 2020 Summer Olympics in Tokyo. The top six teams aside from the Olympic hosts, Japan, advanced to the final Olympic qualifier to be hosted in Shanghai, China. The top three nations also qualified for the 2021 Women's World Championships.

Participants

Preliminary round

Group A

Group B

Final round

Classification 5th–8th place

Final standings

Source: World Baseball Softball Confederation

Individual awards
Most Valuable Player:  Eri Yamada
Best Pitcher:  Misaki Katsumata
Best Hitter:  Angeline Ursabia
Best Slugger: Angeline Ursabia
Most Stolen Base: Mikiko Eguchi
Most Runs Batted (RBI):  Chen Chia-Yi

References

Asian Women's Softball Championship
International sports competitions hosted by Indonesia
2019 in Indonesian sport
July 2019 sports events in Indonesia
2019 in women's softball
2019 in Indonesian women's sport